Dorogobuzh is a village in Rivne Oblast in western Ukraine, located fourteen km from the town of Hoshcha. Until 2020 it belonged to Hoshcha Raion, afterwards to Rivne Raion. The settlement was first mentioned in 1084. Its name probably originates from a combination of words "Dorog + Bug (Buzh)", in Ukrainian and Russian means "route to Bug". In XI—XIII centuries, at place of the modern village, there existed a Kievan Rus' city of the Dorogobuzh kingdom, a part of the Kingdom of Galicia–Volhynia. 

Now the estimate of village population is 663.

References 

Villages in Rivne Raion